The City Walls of Toledo are the city walls of Toledo, Castile-La Mancha, Spain. They were made by several civilizations that inhabited Toledo. 

Toledo was first walled by Romans, and the remains of some Roman walls can still be found today. Stones of these walls were reused during reconstruction by the Visigoths, who tripled the walls in size.

The Visigoth King Wamba renewed the former walls and sculpted inscriptions in city gates. Those inscriptions were destroyed by the Muslims, and other inscriptions were made in 1575 by the Corregidor Juan Gutiérrez Tello. 

The Arabs enlarged the walls and the city of Toledo. After the Reconquista, the walls were again enlarged and new gates were constructed.

References

External links

City walls in Spain
Bien de Interés Cultural landmarks in the City of Toledo
Buildings and structures in Toledo, Spain